Yaroslav Zhmudenko is a Ukrainian table tennis player. He competed at the 2012 Summer Olympics in the Men's singles, but was defeated in the first round.

References

Ukrainian male table tennis players
1988 births
Living people
People from Uman
Olympic table tennis players of Ukraine
Table tennis players at the 2012 Summer Olympics
Table tennis players at the 2015 European Games
European Games competitors for Ukraine
Sportspeople from Cherkasy Oblast